Halpe homolea, the Indian ace or Ceylon ace, is a butterfly belonging to the family Hesperiidae.

Description

Subspecies
H. h. aucma Swinhoe, 1893 - Manipur, Meghalaya, Nagaland
H. h. hindu Evans, 1937 - Karnataka, Kerala, Tamil Nadu
H. h. molta Evans, 1949 - Sikkim
H. h. perfossa South, 1913 - Arunachal Pradesh

References

External links

Astictopterini
Butterflies of Asia